Lakeside School District may refer to:

 Lakeside School District, based in Hot Springs, Arkansas
 Lakeside School District, based in Lake Village, Arkansas

See also
 Lakeside Union School District (disambiguation)
 Lakeside School (disambiguation)
 Lakeside High School (disambiguation)
 Lakeside School District (disambiguation)
 Lakeside (disambiguation)
 Lakeside Academy (disambiguation)
 Lakeside College